Escalquens is a railway station in Escalquens, Occitanie, southern France. Within TER Occitanie, it is part of lines 10 (Toulouse–Narbonne) and 25 (Portbou–Toulouse).

References

Railway stations in Haute-Garonne
Railway stations in France opened in 1857